Walter Brueggemann (born March 11, 1933) is an American Protestant Old Testament scholar and theologian who is widely considered one of the most influential Old Testament scholars of the last several decades. His work often focuses on the Hebrew prophetic tradition and sociopolitical imagination of the Church. He argues that the Church must provide a counter-narrative to the dominant forces of consumerism, militarism, and nationalism.

He has contributed to Living the Questions.

Career
Brueggemann was born in Tilden, Nebraska in 1933. He received an A.B. from Elmhurst College (1955), a B.D. from Eden Theological Seminary (1958), a Th.D. from Union Theological Seminary, New York (1961), and Ph.D. from Saint Louis University (in 1974). The son of a minister of the German Evangelical Synod of North America, he was ordained in the United Church of Christ. He was professor of Old Testament (1961–1986) and Dean (1968–1982) at Eden Theological Seminary. Beginning in 1986, he served as William Marcellus McPheeters professor of Old Testament at Columbia Theological Seminary, from which he retired in the early 2000s. Brueggemann currently resides in Traverse City, Michigan (2020). He is the editor of Journal for Preachers.

Thought
Brueggemann is an advocate and practitioner of rhetorical criticism. He has written more than 58 books, hundreds of articles, and several commentaries on books of the Bible. He is also a contributor to a number of the Living the Questions DVD programs and is featured in the program "Countering Pharaoh's Production-Consumption Society Today." Brueggemann participated in Bill Moyers' 1990s PBS television series on Genesis (documented in Genesis: A Living Conversation. Main Street Books, 1997. ).

Originally a strong supporter of modern day Israel and its biblical claims, Brueggemann later repudiated Israel for its exploitation of "ancient promises" to create a "toxic ideology," and now affirms his belief that it is not anti-Semitic to stand up for justice for Palestinians.

Brueggemann is known throughout the world for his method of combining literary and sociological modes when reading the Bible. V. S. Parrish categorized Brueggemann as being an exegete and theologian.  As an exegete he has composed several commentaries (Genesis, Exodus, Deuteronomy, 1 and 2 Samuel, Isaiah, and Jeremiah). His most notable work was on the book of Psalms, and he has written many monographs and articles on specific portions of the Hebrew Bible. For example, he believes that lament is lacking in current religious faith and practice with detrimental results according to the subject. As a theologian he has been an editor for the Fortress Press series "Overtures to Biblical Theology". His development of Old Testament theological methods consists of literary mode, social function, and dialectical approach.  Titles such as "David's Truth in Israel's Imagination and Memory" (1985), "Power, Providence and Personality" (1990), "1 Kings and 2 Kings" (1982c), "The Prophetic Imagination" (1978), and "Hopeful Imagination" (1986) reflect his interest in the prophetic corpus.

Honors
Among his honors are: 
LL.D., DePauw University, 1984
D.D., Virginia Theological Seminary, 1988
D.H.Litt., Doane College, 1990
D.D., Jesuit School of Theology, 1993
D.Litt., Colgate University, 1997
D.H.Litt., Elmhurst College, 1997
D.D., Huron University College, 2014

There is also a festschrift in his honor: God in the Fray: A Tribute to Walter Brueggemann (eds. Tod Linafelt and Timothy Beal, Minneapolis: Fortress Press).

Publications

Advent/Christmas; Proclamation 3: Aids for Interpreting the Lessons of the Church Year, Series B. Edited by Elizabeth Achtemeier. Fortress Press, 1984. 

Belonging and Growing in the Christian Community. Edited by Elizabeth McWhorter. General Assembly Mission Board, Presbyterian Church in the United States, 1979.
The Bible Makes Sense. St Mary's College Press, 1977.
---. 2d ed. Franciscan Media, 2003, 

"The Book of Exodus". In The New Interpreter's Bible. Vol. 1. Nashville: Abingdon Press, 1994. ISBN.
The Book That Breathes New Life: Scriptural Authority and Biblical Theology. 2005. ISBN.

Confirming Our Faith, Chapters 4,5,7,8,9,18; edited by Larry E Kalp. United Church Press, 1980.
Confronting the Bible: A Resource and Discussion Book for Youth. United Church Press, 1968.

---. 2d ed. Minneapolis: Fortress Press, 2002. ISBN.
Deuteronomy: Abingdon Old Testament Commentaries. Abingdon Press, 2001. ISBN.
Divine Presence amid Violence: Contextualizing the Book of Joshua. Cascade Books, 2009. .
Easter; Proclamation 4 (Series A). Fortress Press, 1989.
Ethos and Ecumenism: The History of Eden Theological Seminary, 1925-1970. Eden Publishing House, 1975.
The Evangelical Catechism Revisited, 1847-1972. Eden Publishing House, 1972.
Fatal Embrace: Christians, Jews, and the Search for Peace in the Holy Land. Synergy Books, 2010. . Foreword to the book by Mark Braverman.

I Kings (Knox Preaching Guides). Edited by John H Hayes. John Knox Press, 1982. 
II Kings (Knox Preaching Guides). Edited by John H Hayes. John Knox Press, 1982.
1 & 2 Kings: Smyth & Helwys Bible Commentary. Smyth & Helwys Publishing, 2000. 

In Man We Trust: The Neglected Side of Biblical Faith. John Knox Press, 1972. .

With George R Beasley-Murray, Jeremiah: Faithfulness in the Midst of Fickleness. The Newell Lectureships II edited by Timothy Dwyer. Warner Press, Inc, 1993.

The Land: Place as Gift, Promise, and Challenge in Biblical Faith. Fortress Press, 1977,   
---. 2d ed. Overtures to Biblical Theology. Fortress Press, 2002. .
Living toward a Vision: Biblical Reflections on Shalom. United Church Press, 1976, 1982. 
Mandate to Difference: An Invitation to the Contemporary Church. Westminster John Knox Press, 2007. 
Many Voices, One God: Being Faithful in a Pluralistic World. Co-Edited with George Stroup Louisville, Kentucky: Westminster John Knox Press, 1998.

Praying the Psalms. St Mary's College Press, 1982.

The Prophetic Imagination. Minneapolis: Fortress Press, 1978. ISBN.

 
Reality, Grief, Hope: Three Urgent Prophetic Tasks. Eerdmans, 2014.
The Renewing Word. Edited by Elmer JF Arndt. United Church Press, 1968.
Revelation and Violence: A Study in Contextualization; 1986 Pere Marquette Theology Lecture. Marquette University Press, 1986.

A Social Reading of the Old Testament: Prophetic Approaches to Israel's Communal Life. Edited by Patrick D Miller. Fortress Press, 1994. 

With Charles Cousar et al., Texts for Preaching: A Lectionary Commentary Based on the NRSV-Year A. Westminster/John Knox, 1995.
With Charles Cousar et al., Texts for Preaching: A Lectionary Commentary Based on the NRSV-Year B. Westminster/John Knox, 1993.

The Theology of the Book of Jeremiah. Cambridge Univ. Press, 2006. ISBN.

Theology of the Old Testament. Fortress Press, 2005. ISBN.

To Act Justly, Love Tenderly, Walk Humbly. (With Sharon Parks and Thomas H. Groome). Paulist Press, 1986.
---. WIPF & Stock, 1997. 
To Build, to Plant: A Commentary on Jeremiah 26–52: International Theological Commentary on the Old Testament. Continuum International Publishing Group, 1991. 
To Pluck Up, to Tear Down: A Commentary on the Book of Jeremiah 1–25: International Theological Commentary on the Old Testament. Eerdmans Publishing Company, 1988. 
Tradition for Crisis: A Study in Hosea. John Knox Press, 1968.

The Vitality of Old Testament Traditions. John Knox Press, 1975.

What Are Christians For? An Enquiry into Obedience and Dissent. Pflaum-Standard, 1971.

References

External links
A look at Walter Brueggemann on biblical authority
About Walter Brueggemann
Walter Brueggemann and the role of imagination in Biblical theology
Walter Brueggemann Website
Faculty Emeriti Directory, Columbia Theological Seminary

1933 births
Living people
American biblical scholars
American Christian theologians
United Church of Christ ministers
Elmhurst College alumni
Eden Theological Seminary alumni
Union Theological Seminary (New York City) alumni
Saint Louis University alumni
Columbia Theological Seminary faculty
Old Testament scholars
People from Tilden, Nebraska